The Aruba national korfball team is managed by the Korfball Bond Aruba (KBA), representing Aruba in korfball international competitions.

Tournament history

References 

National korfball teams
Korfball
National team